Samuel Serrano (born November 17, 1952) is a Puerto Rican former professional boxer who competed from 1969 to 1984 and made a two-fight comeback from 1996 to 1997. He was a two-time super featherweight world champion, having held the WBA title twice between 1976 and 1983.

According to Serrano during a 2017 interview with El Nuevo Dia newspaper, he learned to box starting at age 5 when he lived at Palmarejos barrio in Corozal.

Professional boxing career
Serrano, owner of long arms, began his career on October 29, 1969, with a four-round decision win over Ramon Laureano. He built a fan base in Puerto Rico, campaigning there for his first 23 bouts, including winning and losing the Puerto Rican Featherweight title v.s Francisco Villegas. For his 24th bout, he traveled to Panama City, where he met future world Featherweight champion Ernesto Marcel, who beat him on points in 10 rounds. That would be his last defeat in a long time.

He then continued his winning ways, including a 10-round decision win over tough veteran Cocoa Perez and one win over former title challenger Diego Alcala, also by decision in 10. Serrano then travelled in 1976 to Honolulu, Hawaii, to meet reigning Lineal and WBA world jr. Lightweight champion, the Filipino Ben Villaflor. By most writer's accounts, Serrano beat Villaflor, but he had to return home only with a 15-round draw (tie).

The WBA ordered an immediate rematch, and so on October 16 of the same year, Villaflor went to San Juan to defend his title for the second time vs. Serrano. Serrano beat Villaflor by using his ring technique to win 12 of the 15 rounds on each judges' scorecards. As life had it, Samuel Serrano was destined to become a world champion in front of his fans.

Serrano became a traveling champion, defending his title in places like Venezuela, Ecuador, South Africa, Japan (twice) and, of course, Puerto Rico. One of his defenses, against Julio Diablito Valdez, resulted in an after-fight brawl when Serrano was announced as winner by a unanimous decision and went to greet his rival but was received with a punch to the face. Serrano retaliated, and police intervention was needed. Both fighters were escorted to their dressing rooms by the police. But disaster struck for Serrano in Detroit on August 2 of 1980, when, after leading on all scorecards, he was struck by a Yasutsune Uehara right hand to the chin in round six, and lost his title by knockout to the Japanese. After that loss, he set his eyes on recovering his world title from the Japanese world champion, and so  on April 9, 1981, they met again, this time in Wakayama, Japan. Serrano was more cautious this time, and didn't try to go for the knockout after building a points lead. Even though Uehara was fighting in his homeland, all judges agreed and gave Serrano more rounds than they gave Uehara, and Serrano the world title back by a fifteen-round unanimous decision.

Serrano made two defenses and then went to Chile to give challenger Benedicto Villablanca a chance at the title on June 3, 1982. It proved to be a highly controversial fight. After 5 rounds, Serrano was ahead on the scorecards. However, a cut appeared over his eye during the 6th, and the referee ruled it to be from a punch. Serrano kept fighting, but during the 11th round, the cut was so deep, the fight had to be stopped by the doctor and Serrano had to be taken to a Santiago hospital. Since the referee ruled the cut came from a punch, initially the fight and the world title were given to Villablanca.

Serrano and his corner filed a complaint, however, claiming the cut had been caused by a headbutt instead, and upon review at the WBA's Panama City offices, WBA officials announced they had effectively seen the headbutt that Serrano claimed opened his cut happen. So the WBA decided the cut had come from a headbutt, and the judges' scorecards were reviewed. They had Serrano ahead on points after 10 rounds, so the fight, and the crown, were given back to Serrano by a technical decision.

In his next defense he met the younger and physically stronger Roger Mayweather. Serrano and Mayweather gave it a good fight for most of 7 rounds, but Serrano was weakened by a barrage of punches towards the end of the 7th, and downed with a right hand in the 8th, this time, losing the title definitively.

Retirement
Serrano retired from the ring for one year and came back in 1984, winning by first round knockout. Then, he retired again.

In 1996, Serrano won the Puerto Rican Lightweight title vs Sammy Mejias on a 12-round decision, and  he also won a 10-round decision vs Anthony Ivory in 1997. Serrano retired after the Ivory fight with a final record of 50 wins, 5 defeats and 17 knockouts.

He made a television commercial for Budweiser in Puerto Rico in 1982. 
 
As of 2017, Serrano was living in a beach house at Islote, ciudad de Arecibo. He dedicated himself to fixing beachfront apartments and renting them, as well as to creating mosaic art, some of which he sold.

Professional boxing record

See also
List of world super-featherweight boxing champions
List of Puerto Rican boxing world champions
Sports in Puerto Rico
Afro–Puerto Ricans

References

External links

Samuel Serrano biography
Samuel Serrano - CBZ Profile

 

1952 births
Living people
Puerto Rican male boxers
People from Toa Alta, Puerto Rico
World super-featherweight boxing champions
The Ring (magazine) champions
World Boxing Association champions